The Front for Socialism and Democracy/Benno Jubël (Front pour le socialisme et la démocratie) is a political party in Senegal. 
At the legislative elections of 3 June 2007, the party won 2.18% of the popular vote and 1 out of 150 seats.

References

Political parties in Senegal
Social democratic parties in Africa
Socialist parties in Senegal